Dhundhsar is a village in Sihor Tehsil of Bhavnagar district in the State of Gujarat, India.  The nearest town is Palitana (12 km).

According to Census 2011 information the location code or village code of Dhundhsar village is 516409. . It is situated 25 km away from sub-district headquarter Sihor and 48 km away from district headquarter Bhavnagar. As per 2009 stats, Dhundhsar village is also a gram panchayat.

The total geographical area of village is 1129.04 hectares. Dhundhsar has a total population of 3,296 people. There are about 517 houses in Dhundhsar.

Villages near Dhundhsar
 Tarakpaldi
 TANA
 Karmadiya
 Thala
 Bekdi
 Gundala
 Sarkadia
 Varal
 Bhankhal
 Thorali
 Songadh
 Bhamariya
 Lavarada
 Budhna

Villages in Bhavnagar district